Mordellistena breddini is a species of beetle in the family Mordellidae. It is in the genus Mordellistena. It was described in 1963 by Ermisch.

References

breddini
Endemic fauna of Germany
Beetles described in 1963